The Men's 25 km competition of the Open water swimming events at the 2011 World Aquatics Championships was held on July 23.

Medalists

Results
The final was held on July 23.

References

External links
2011 World Aquatics Championships: Men's 25 km start list, from OmegaTiming.com; retrieved 2011-07-21.

Men's 25 km
World Aquatics Championships